{{DISPLAYTITLE:Chi3 Sagittarii}}

Chi3 Sagittarii (χ3 Sagittarii) is a solitary, orange-hued star in the zodiac constellation of Sagittarius. It is faintly visible to the naked eye with an apparent visual magnitude of +5.45.  Based upon an annual parallax shift of 6.53 mas as seen from Earth, it is located roughly 500 light years from the Sun. It is receding from the Earth with a radial velocity of 39.6 km/s.

This is an evolved, K-type giant star with a stellar classification of K3 III. It is a suspected optical variable star with a magnitude range of 5.42 to 5.46. At infrared wavelengths, it shows large amplitude variation with a period of 505 days. The star has expanded to about 37 times the Sun's radius and is radiating 301 times the solar luminosity from its photosphere at an effective temperature of 4,040 K.

References

K-type giants
Sagittarii, Chi03
Sagittarius (constellation)
Durchmusterung objects
Sagittarii, 49
182416
095503
7363